Michael Haydn's Symphony No. 6 in C major, Perger 4, Sherman 6, Sherman-adjusted 8, MH 64, was written in Salzburg, completed in 1764. It is the 31st symphony in C major attributed to Joseph Haydn in Anthony van Hoboken's catalog.

Scored for 2 oboes, 2 bassoons, 2 horns, and strings, in three movements:

Vivace
Andante, in C minor
Tempo di Menuetto

References
 A. Delarte, "A Quick Overview Of The Instrumental Music Of Michael Haydn" Bob's Poetry Magazine November 2006: 16 - 17 PDF
 Charles H. Sherman and T. Donley Thomas, Johann Michael Haydn (1737 - 1806), a chronological thematic catalogue of his works. Stuyvesant, New York: Pendragon Press (1993)
 C. Sherman, "Johann Michael Haydn" in The Symphony: Salzburg, Part 2 London: Garland Publishing (1982): lxiv

Symphony 06
1764 compositions
Compositions in C major
Compositions with a spurious or doubtful attribution